Maximowicz's vole (Microtus maximowiczii) is a species of rodent in the family Cricetidae.
It is found in northeastern China, Mongolia, and eastern Russia.

Description
Maximowicz's vole is one of the largest voles in the genus Microtus. The fur on the back is dark brownish-black with ochre specks, and the flanks are paler brown, blending gradually into the greyish-white underparts. The upper sides of the hands and feet are whitish-brown. The tail is either uniform dark brown or bicoloured, with the upper side dark brown and the underside white. Its scientific and common names commemorate the prominent Russian botanist Karl Maximovich, who was curator of the herbarium at the Saint Petersburg Botanical Garden at the time the vole was described by Leopold von Schrenck.

Distribution and habitat
Maximowicz's vole is found in eastern Asia. Its range extends from Lake Baikal eastward to the mountains of northeastern Mongolia, the Amur River basin and northeastern China. Its typical habitats are forest and steppe and it is found in areas of dense vegetation in valleys and foothills.

Behaviour
Maximowicz's vole is most active early in the morning and shortly before nightfall when it emerges from its burrow to feed on grasses and other plant material. Other side chambers are used for storing roots and bulbs for winter food. Not much is known of the breeding habits of Maximowicz's vole but females have been reported as carrying seven and nine embryos.

Status
Maximowicz's vole has a very wide range. It is common in much of that range and faces no particular identified threats, so the International Union for Conservation of Nature has assessed its conservation status as being of "least concern".

References

Microtus
Mammals described in 1859
Taxa named by Leopold von Schrenck
Taxonomy articles created by Polbot